Alex Mangels (born July 29, 1993) is an American soccer player.

Career

College and Amateur
Mangels spent his entire college career at the University of California, Berkeley between 2012 and 2015, including a red-shirted year in 2011.

Professional
Mangels signed with United Soccer League club Tulsa Roughnecks on February 27, 2016. In 2017 he joined the San Francisco Deltas of the North American Soccer League (NASL). He made one appearance for the 2017 NASL Champions, before the Club folded weeks after winning the League.

In 2018, Mangels signed with USL side Portland Timbers 2.

On January 18, 2019, Mangels joined USL League One club Chattanooga Red Wolves ahead of their inaugural season.

References

External links
 
 Golden Bears bio
 

1993 births
Living people
American soccer players
Association football goalkeepers
California Golden Bears men's soccer players
Chattanooga Red Wolves SC players
North American Soccer League players
People from Lafayette, California
Portland Timbers 2 players
San Francisco Deltas players
Soccer players from California
Sportspeople from the San Francisco Bay Area
FC Tulsa players
USL Championship players
USL League One players